Port of Palermo is a port serving Palermo, Sicily, Italy.

The port of Palermo is one of the major ports for passenger traffic in the Mediterranean. According to author Patrizia Fabbri the port has been "a constant driving force not only for the island's economy, but in the history of the city of Palermo".
It stretches for a few kilometers away from Francesco Crispi, near the ancient port of Cala, incorporating areas including Arenella and Acqua Santa. In 2018 6,189,091 tonnes and 1,986,941 passengers (of which 577,934 are cruise passengers) passed through the port.

The port area includes the shipyard run by Fincantieri with its two graving docks.

References

External links
Official site 

Ports and harbours of Italy
Transport in Palermo